Jack Nelsen is an American politician, retired music teacher, and dairy farmer, representing District 26B in the Idaho House of Representatives since 2022. A member of the Republican Party, Nelsen generated controversy in his first-ever House Agricultural Affairs Committee meeting for saying he had "definite opinions" about reproduction and women's health because of his experience with cows, for which he subsequently apologized and clarified that he is pro-choice.

References 

Year of birth missing (living people)
Living people
Place of birth missing (living people)
Republican Party members of the Idaho House of Representatives
Farmers from Idaho
People from Jerome, Idaho
College of Southern Idaho alumni
University of Redlands alumni
Boise State University alumni